Metasambus is a genus of beetles in the family Buprestidae, containing the following species:

 Metasambus hoscheki (Obenberger, 1916)
 Metasambus tonkinensis Descarpentries & Villiers, 1966
 Metasambus weyersi (Kerremans, 1900)

References

Buprestidae genera